Below is an episodic synopsis of Kampong Ties, which consists of 30 episodes and broadcast on MediaCorp Channel 8 in Singapore and ntv7 in Malaysia. The synopsis is according to Singapore's synopsis.

Episodes

See also
List of programmes broadcast by ntv7
List of programmes broadcast by Mediacorp Channel 8
Kampong Ties

Lists of Singaporean television series episodes
Lists of Malaysian television series episodes
Lists of soap opera episodes